is an anime television series produced by MAPPA, Avex Pictures and Cygames. The series aired in Japan between October and December 2018. A second season titled Zombie Land Saga Revenge aired between April and June 2021.  An anime film project has been announced.  A manga adaptation that loosely follows the events of the anime, began serialization on Cygames' Cycomi website in October 2018; a spinoff series, titled Zombie Land Saga Sidestory: The First Zombie, started running in Ultra Jump magazine in May 2021.

Plot
In the year 2008, high school student Sakura Minamoto is abruptly killed by a truck on the morning she plans to submit an idol application. Ten years later, Sakura, along with six "legendary" girls from various eras of Japan's history, are brought back as zombies by a man named Kotaro Tatsumi, who seeks to revitalize Saga Prefecture by putting together an all-zombie idol group that would become known as Franchouchou.

Characters

Franchouchou
 is an idol group founded by Kotaro Tatsumi and composed of seven legendary idols from different time periods that he brought back to life as zombies with the goal of reviving Saga's declining idol business. Because of the possibility of being persecuted should their identities be exposed, they perform using aliases and hide their zombified states using makeup.

 

Portrayed by Sakiho Motonishi
A high school girl and aspiring idol who dies in 2008 after being hit by a truck following a life filled with misfortune. She is the first of the zombies to regain consciousness after being resurrected, but initially retained no recollection of her life, only remembering parts of her past when she performs. Near the group's performance at Arpino, she fully regained her memory, only to  lose her previous memories as a zombie and subsequently fell into a depression due to her misfortunes in the past. However, she was able to pull through with the help of her teammates.

Portrayed by Yuriya Suzuki
A delinquent girl and leading member of the all-female biker gang Dorami, which conquered the entire Kyushu region before her death during a chicken race in 1997. She is the appointed leader of Franchouchou.

Portrayed by Rie Matsuoka
The former lead performer of Iron Frill, a 2000s idol group Sakura idolized in life, who was killed after being struck by lightning during a concert. Not wanting to be remembered only for her tragic death, she resolves to work hard in her second chance at life. In Revenge, the current incarnation of Iron Frill invite her to join them, but she ultimately turns them down in favor of staying with Franchouchou.

Portrayed by Yūna Kitahara
A soft-spoken idol from the Shōwa period who was popular during the 1980s before dying in a plane crash. Coming from an era without social media, she has reservations towards personally interacting with her fans. She is sometimes seen playing an acoustic guitar, but can also play electric.

Portrayed by Mioka Sakamoto
An oiran who lived between the Bakumatsu and the Meiji Restoration eras in the 19th century. In Revenge it is revealed that she was executed after taking the blame for organizing a rebellion to restore Saga's statehood, which had been revoked at the time.

Portrayed by Rin Takanashi
A prodigious, transgender child actress who died in 2011 from a heart attack caused by a combination of occupational stress and gender dysphoria. She has no qualms about being a zombie, seeing it as a way to continue being a child forever, and will never have to go through puberty.

Portrayed by Asami Morita
The only zombie who has yet to regain human consciousness. She is the one who officially names the group Franchouchou, which is derived from her sneezing. In The First Zombie, it's revealed that, in her previous life, she was an office worker with a secret double-life as a demon slaying exorcist and the previous owner of the mansion where Franchouchou now lives.

Supporting characters

Portrayed by Noriyuki Ohashi
A manic producer and necromancer who resurrects Sakura and the other girls to "save" Saga by forming the idol group Franchouchou. He is eventually revealed to be Sakura's former high school classmate , who wanted to make her dream come true. While the meaning of his intention to "save" Saga initially seemed to be simply to revitalize the struggling prefecture, it is revealed in Revenge that he meant it literally, as the land is prophesied to face disaster.

Kotaro's undead pet toy poodle.

An unnamed police officer who repeatedly encounters Sakura and the other undead girls.

Related with Franchouchou 

The ex-manager and father of Lily. He is a large man whose face is often mistaken for that of a yakuza.

First captain of the motorcycle gang Dorami, who retired to give birth to Maria and lead a normal life. She saves a photo with Saki along with her old Tamagotchi and motorcycle.

A chief reporter who works alongside his photographer . Both begin investigating Franchouchou after recognizing Junko in the Drive-in Tori commercial.

The bartender of Bar New Jofuku who is personally familiar with Kotaro, Yugiri, and the Zombie Land Saga Project. It is revealed in Revenge that his immortality is linked to the status of Saga. His name and the bar's name references Chinese medical scholar Xu Fu, named "Jofuku" in Japanese, who was ordered by Qin Shi Huang to find the elixir of life.

A high school girl and avid fan of Franchouchou to who discovers the zombies' identities after Kotaro attempts to recruit her, mistakenly thinking that he killed her.

Production
Cygames announced the series, in collaboration with Avex Pictures, on July 5, 2018. The series is directed by Munehisa Sakai and written by Shigeru Murakoshi, with animation by studio MAPPA. The series' character designs are provided by Kasumi Fukagawa, Kazuo Ogura is the art director, Takashi Yanagida is serving as director of photography, Azusa Sasaki is the color designer, and Masahiro Goto is editing the series. Yasuharu Takanashi is composing the series' music, which is produced by Avex Pictures, while dugout is producing the sound. The 12-episode series aired between October 4 and December 20, 2018, and was broadcast on AT-X, Tokyo MX, Sun TV, BS11, Saga TV, and TVQ. The series was simulcast outside of Asia with Japanese audio and English subtitles by Crunchyroll and with English audio by Funimation. An uncut version of the dub that translates the main songs from the anime series was eventually released by Funimation at the end of 2019.

Medialink licensed the first season in Southeast Asia and South Asia, and streamed it on Netflix, Aniplus Asia, and Bilibili, while Muse Communication holds the distribution rights to the second season.

The opening and ending themes were both released as singles paired with "FANTASTIC LOVERS" and "Jellyfish" (respectively, both sung by Iron Frill, Ai Mizuno's in-universe pre-Franchouchou idol group) on November 28, 2018, and they charted at #13 and #19 (respectively) in the Oricon Singles Chart on December 10, while the opening theme single topped the Billboard Japan Download Songs chart on the same day.

On July 27, 2019, it was announced that the series is getting renewed for a second season, titled Zombie Land Saga Revenge. On February 27, 2021, it was revealed that MAPPA would animate the new season, which aired from on April 8 to June 24, 2021, on AT-X and other channels. Tatsuro Onishi and Momoko Mifune replace Kazuo Ogura and Takashi Yanagida as art director and director of photography. The remaining cast and staff return to reprise their roles. Crunchyroll streamed the series with subtitles, and Funimation stream the series dubbed in English.

On October 17, 2021, it was announced that the series would be receiving an anime film project.

Episodes

Zombie Land Saga

Zombie Land Saga Revenge

Reception

In Anime News Network's previews of the fall 2018 anime season, Zombie Land Saga's first episode received overall positive responses, with most critics praising the premise and darkly comedic tone. James Beckett expressed that he appreciated the variety teased in the core cast, and found little to critique. Theron Martin, Paul Jensen, and Nick Creamer all gave similarly enthused praises, with generally shared praises for the cleverness of its genre fusion of idol anime and comic horror. Jensen described the episode's early moments as somewhat tonally confused, but stressed that the remainder of the episode was excellent, and described the dialogue and characterization of Sakura and Kotaro as exceptional. The reviewers all gave scores of 4 out of 5 stars, with the exception of Rebecca Silverman, who gave the first episode 3.5 out of 5 stars and characterized it as "off-putting and very morbid," as well as criticizing the show for its excessive use of loud vocal performances and flashing lights, which she said could potentially upset some viewers. Despite these criticisms, Silverman said that Zombie Land Saga was "worth checking out" for the originality of its premise.

The character of Lily Hoshikawa has received substantial praise from critics as an example of transgender representation, with writers at outlets including the Daily Dot and Crunchyroll (the show's official English distributor) voicing positive responses to her role in the story. However, while the show's creative staff have spoken about their intent to depict her as a trans character in interviews, promotional material in magazines such as Animage has described Lily as "a boy" in contradiction with the anime's narrative and the stated intentions of the writers.

During a May 2019 session of the UK Parliamentary Joint Committee on Human Rights where executives from Facebook and Twitter faced accusations over the way they handled vitriol directed at parliamentarians on social media in violation of those websites' terms of service concerning abuse and harassment. The Scottish National Party Member of Parliament Joanna Cherry cited, among several other tweets that were not removed swiftly by Twitter, one displaying Lily Hoshikawa.

Zombie Land Saga won the 2019 Tokyo Anime Awards Festival award for Animation of the Year.

On August 12, 2019, the special Natsu no Saga, a documentary on the anime, featured governor of Saga Yoshinori Yamaguchi cosplaying as major character Kotaro Tatsumi.

Gadget Tsūshin listed "nice bird" (referring to the fifth episode) and "Masao" (Lily's deadname) in their 2019 anime buzzwords list.

In May 2021, Zombie Land Saga was one of five anime titles (along with KonoSuba, That Time I Got Reincarnated as a Slime, Princess Lover!, and Nekopara) that were given a limited ban by the Russian government for their depiction of reincarnation, which was thought to encourage suicide by lawmakers.

Awards and nominations

Other media
A manga adaptation by Megumu Soramichi began serialization on Cygames' Cycomi website on October 8, 2018. This manga iteration primarily focuses on Kotaro, tying in with the episodes from the anime from his perspective. A second manga adaptation focusing on the past of Tae Yamada, illustrated by character designer Kasumi Fukagawa, was serialized in Shueisha's seinen manga magazine Ultra Jump from May 19, 2021, to November 17, 2022.

A stage play based on the anime, Zombie Land Saga Stage de Do-n!, was set to be performed March 11 to 14, 2020, but was originally cancelled to due to the worsening COVID-19 pandemic in Japan, and was then brought back to be run during the September of that year. It adapted the first seven episodes of the anime series.

In June 2021, the mobile rhythm game BanG Dream! Girls Band Party! held a collaboration event with Zombie Land Saga. The partnership included a special story and themed cards for the in-game band Pastel＊Palettes, who also performed a cover version of "Adabana Necromancy". Fellow band Poppin'Party covered "Taiga yo Tomo ni Naite Kure". Kotaro makes an appearance in the event, for which Miyano reprises his role.

On December 28, 2022, a special program was aired on TV Q in Kyushu, featuring Roland touring the locales and special places that were featured in the anime, along with narration by main character Sakura's voice actress, Kaede Hondo.

Notes

References

External links
  
 

2010s LGBT-related comedy television series
2021 anime television series debuts
Anime with original screenplays
AT-X (TV network) original programming
Avex Group
Comedy anime and manga
Crunchyroll Anime Awards winners
Cygames franchises
Funimation
Horror anime and manga
Japanese idols in anime and manga
Japanese LGBT-related animated television series
LGBT speculative fiction television series
MAPPA
Medialink
Muse Communication
Seinen manga
Shogakukan manga
Shōnen manga
Shueisha manga
Television shows set in Saga Prefecture
Transgender in anime and manga
Works banned in Russia
Zombies in anime and manga
Zombies in television